Odd Tandberg (16 April 1924 – 14 February 2017), was a Norwegian painter and printmaker.

References 

1924 births
2017 deaths
People from Ås, Akershus
Norwegian printmakers
20th-century Norwegian painters
21st-century Norwegian painters
Norwegian male painters
20th-century Norwegian male artists
21st-century Norwegian male artists